Satan Hates You is a 2010 American horror film written and directed by James Felix McKenney.

Plot
A homage to end of times Christian horror movies of the 1970s, the story follows the crisis of faith of an unemployed alcoholic and a pregnant, cocaine snorting, pill popping teenager. Two demons try to claim their souls while heavenly missionaries try and set the damned heroes on the path of redemption.

References

External links

2010 horror films
American supernatural horror films
2010 films
Demons in film
2010s English-language films
2010s American films